Ronald Leslie Baynham (born 10 June 1929) is an English former footballer, best known as a goalkeeper for Luton Town. He is currently the oldest surviving player to have represented England.

Playing career

Baynham first took up goalkeeping during a spell in the army on National Service, and declined a trial with Wolverhampton Wanderers soon after, thinking himself not good enough. After starring at Worcester City he felt confident enough to accept a move to Luton Town. For four years he competed with Bernard Streten for the number one shirt, but by 1955 Baynham was Luton's regular 'keeper.

Baynham played for the club until 1964, when the 35-year-old retired. He gained a total of 3 caps for England during his time at Luton.

References

1929 births
Living people
Footballers from Birmingham, West Midlands
English footballers
England international footballers
Association football goalkeepers
Worcester City F.C. players
Luton Town F.C. players
English Football League players
English Football League representative players
FA Cup Final players
20th-century British Army personnel